Sir John Francis Edward Acton, 6th Baronet (3 June 1736 12 August 1811) was a French-born English gentleman who served as Commander of the naval forces of the Grand Duchy of Tuscany and later as Prime Minister of the Kingdom of Naples under Ferdinand IV. He served at Naples during the turbulent times when French Revolutionary fervour under Napoleon was sweeping across Europe and threatening to extinguish the monarchy he served.

Origins
John was born on 3 June 1736 at Besançon in France, the son of Edward Acton, an English-born physician who had settled in that town, the great-grandson of Sir Walter Acton, 2nd Baronet (1623–1665) of Aldenham Park, Morville, in Shropshire, England. In 1791, aged 55, John succeeded his second cousin once removed as 6th Baronet.

Career

Service in Tuscany
He served under his uncle in the navy of the Grand Duchy of Tuscany. In 1773, while serving as Captain of the Tuscan frigate Austria, he destroyed several vessels in the Gulf of Tunis. While cruising off Tetouan he was informed that two Algerine xebecs and five Salé Rovers were about to enter the Mediterranean. On 14 October he observed off Cape Spartel, two vessels making for the straits; one hove to under the Cape, apparently awaiting her consort with whom she was exchanging signals, but a thick fog concealed her for three hours: when it cleared off she was nearly within gun-shot, the Salé flag flying, a signal up, and everything ready for action. Acton immediately ran her within half musket-shot and poured in a fire of all arms; she struck her colours and was taken after a feeble resistance without aid from her consort. She mounted 24 guns, and the remains of her crew, amounting to 80 prisoners, were sent to the Austria.

After securing this prize Acton gave chase to the second frigate and ran her ashore near Algiers, but in waiting for a favourable moment to complete his work another Salé frigate and two xebecs bore down on him. After a short chase the frigate was driven ashore by the Austria and destroyed with two broadsides. Acton then chased one xebec off the port of Larache and opened fire, but under cover of the batteries she got safely in. The second frigate was also of 24 guns, the xebecs of 23 and 16 guns each, but the second escaped while the other was engaged with Acton. He afterwards discovered that they formed one squadron, and had left Larache to capture the Austria, but not a single Tuscan seaman was killed or wounded throughout the campaign.

In 1775 he commanded the Tuscan frigates in the Spanish-led Invasion of Algiers. Concerning the calamitous disembarkation in which the Spanish were drawn into a trap by the feigned retreat of the Algerines, the travel writer Henry Swinburne wrote that the Spaniards would have been "broken and slaughtered to a man ... had not Mr. Acton, the Tuscan commander, cut his cables and let his ships drive in to shore just as the enemy was coming on us full gallop. The incessant fire of his great guns, loaded with grape-shot, not only stop't them in their career but obliged them to retire with great loss."

Service in Naples
In 1779 Queen Maria Carolina of Naples persuaded her brother the Grand-Duke Leopold of Tuscany to allow Acton, who had been recommended to her by Prince Caramanico, to undertake the reorganisation of the Neapolitan navy. The ability displayed by him in this led to his rapid advancement. He became commander-in-chief of both the army and the navy of the Kingdom of Naples, minister of finance, and finally prime minister.

His policy, devised in concert with Sir William Hamilton, the English ambassador to Naples,  aimed at removing Spanish influence from Naples and replacing it with that of Britain and Austria. The policy led to open opposition to France and the French party in Italy.

The Neapolitan fleet, which when Acton entered the service of Naples had been practically non-existent, he had built up by 1798 to 120 ships with 1,200 cannon, while the land forces had increased fourfold from 15 to 60 thousand. Unfortunately in no degree were the interests of Naples promoted by the vainglorious policy thus inaugurated, which speedily resulted in disaster. Although Acton had aimed to extend the commerce of the country by increasing the facilities of internal communication and restoring some of the principal ports, the increased taxation required to support the army and navy more than counter-balanced these efforts and caused acute distress and general discontent. The introduction of foreign officers into the services, which had aroused the resentment of the upper classes, was further augmented when the fleet was placed under the orders of the British Admiral Horatio Nelson.

Although Nelson and the British fleet had extinguished French naval power in the Mediterranean by his victory at the Battle of the Nile in August 1798, thereby saving the Kingdom of Naples from naval conquest by Revolutionary France, the French armies entered the north of Italy, where they met successes. In response in December 1798 the King and Queen, together with Acton, Hamilton (and his wife Lady Emma Hamilton), by order of Nelson were evacuated from Naples on board HMS Vanguard to the King's Sicilian capital of Palermo. Thereupon, freed of the royal presence, the Neapolitan citizens and nobles sympathetic to the ideals of the French Revolution promptly established the short-lived Parthenopean Republic, with the aid of the French. However the monarchy was restored in Naples five months later with the help of a Calabrian army, called the Sanfedisti, led by Cardinal Ruffo. To re-establish order and with the consent of the Queen and the help of Ruffo, Acton established at Naples the Junta of State, a reign of terror during which many prominent citizens were thrown into prison or executed. 

In 1804 Acton was removed from power, on the demand of France, but nevertheless advised the king, who had agreed to an alliance with Napoleon, to permit British and Russian troops to land at Naples. Acton was granted a pension of 3000 ducats and was created Duke of Modica, which he later renounced.  Shortly afterwards the minister was recalled, but when the French entered Naples in 1806, he together with the royal family again took refuge in Sicily.

A letter of 25 July 1809 reported that Acton had "returned a few days since from the baths of Termina, not in the least benefited by their waters. The painful effects of a paralytic stroke, and a severe fall last year, are now aggravated by a nearly total deprivation of sight."

Succession to baronetcy
In 1791, aged 55, he succeeded to the Acton baronetcy and estates on the death of his second cousin once removed, Richard Acton, 5th Baronet of Aldenham Park in Shropshire.

Marriage and issue

On 2 February 1800, at the age of 63, he married his 13 year-old niece Mary Ann Acton, the eldest daughter of his younger brother General Joseph Edward Acton (1737-1830). The marriage appears to have been made for dynastic purposes to keep control of the family's wealth and required papal dispensation due to consanguinity. On hearing the news Nelson commented "it is never too late to do well" and following his arrival in Naples threw a party for the newlyweds aboard his flagship, the Foudroyant. "By raising the awning twenty feet, removing the guns, and robing the masts in silk, two spacious rooms were given, and these were most splendidly decorated; and when lighted up in the evening, really presented a fairy-like appearance, while the music that floated over the calm waters of this beautiful bay was softened. All the nobles of the court, with the exception of the king and queen, were there". The festivities were somewhat marred when a drunk English Lieutenant accidentally knocked an Italian princess into the water (on emerging she furiously demanded he be hanged from the foreyard arm).

By his wife he had three children:
Sir Ferdinand Dalberg-Acton, 7th Baronet (1801–1837), eldest son and heir, whose son was John Emerich Edward Dalberg Acton, 1st Baron Acton.
Cardinal Charles Januarius Edward Acton (1803–1847)
Elizabeth Acton (1806–1850), who married Sir Robert Throckmorton, 8th Baronet, of Coughton Court, Warwickshire, and had issue.

Death, burial & monument

He died at Palermo on 12 August 1811, aged 75, and a "magnificent funeral was prepared for him; but during the procession, so tremendous a shower of rain came on, that the body remained abandoned in the street for a long time." 

Acton was buried in the church of Santa Ninfa dei Crociferi, where survives his wall monument, displaying sculpted (all in relief) his bust within a laurel circlet and antique trophy of arms above a pedimented sarcophagus in the form of a double-bodied winged Sphinx, inscribed in Latin as follows:
DOM hic jacet Joannes Acton Angliae dynasta vere egenorum pater. Obiit pridie idus sextilis Anno Domini MDCCCXI aetatis suae LXXV ("To the greatest and best God. Here lies John Acton, from a dynasty of England, truly the father of the needy. He died on the first day of the Ides of the Sixth Month (i.e of the Roman year commencing in March, thus August) in the year of our Lord 1811, (in the year) of his age 75").

Notes

References

1736 births
1811 deaths
John
Baronets in the Baronetage of England
British sailors
18th-century Neapolitan people
Military personnel from Besançon
Knights of the Golden Fleece of Spain
19th-century Neapolitan people